Prichard is an unincorporated community located near Mississippi Highway 3 in Tunica County, Mississippi, United States.

References

Unincorporated communities in Tunica County, Mississippi
Unincorporated communities in Mississippi
Memphis metropolitan area